Alejandra Amalia Sepúlveda Orbenes (born 13 November 1965) is a politician currently serving as a member of the Chamber of Deputies of Chile, representing District 16 of the O'Higgins Region. She previously served as President of the Chamber of Deputies.

References

1965 births
Living people
People from Viña del Mar
Members of the Chamber of Deputies of Chile
Presidents of the Chamber of Deputies of Chile
Austral University of Chile alumni
Women members of the Chamber of Deputies of Chile
Social Green Regionalist Federation politicians
Senators of the LVI Legislative Period of the National Congress of Chile